United States gubernatorial elections were held on 7 November 1961, in two states, New Jersey and Virginia.

Results

References

 
November 1961 events in the United States